Wielka Wieś may refer to the following places:
Wielka Wieś, Kraków County in Lesser Poland Voivodeship (south Poland)
Wielka Wieś, Zduńska Wola County in Łódź Voivodeship (central Poland)
Wielka Wieś, Zgierz County in Łódź Voivodeship (central Poland)
Wielka Wieś, Miechów County in Lesser Poland Voivodeship (south Poland)
Wielka Wieś, Tarnów County in Lesser Poland Voivodeship (south Poland)
Wielka Wieś, Końskie County in Świętokrzyskie Voivodeship (south-central Poland)
Wielka Wieś, Starachowice County in Świętokrzyskie Voivodeship (south-central Poland)
Wielka Wieś, Gmina Buk in Greater Poland Voivodeship (west-central Poland)
Wielka Wieś, Gmina Stęszew in Greater Poland Voivodeship (west-central Poland)
Wielka Wieś, Wolsztyn County in Greater Poland Voivodeship (west-central Poland)
Wielka Wieś, Pomeranian Voivodeship (north Poland)